Ha Seung-moo (born October 13, 1963; also spelled Ha Seung moo) is a South Korean poet, Presbyterian minister, seminary professor, and theologian.

Early life 
Ha was born on February 5, 1964, in Sacheon, South Korea. Ha is the grandson of Sir Ha Yeon, who is the twenty-first grandson of Joseon's most notable prime minister, Yeonguijeong.

After his basic education, Ha began to read modern literature. He was motivated by a bookseller who visited the school and purchased a series of books on modern Korean literature. Thereafter, readings of Korean literature sparked his interest in writing and philosophy. In this process, Ha began to question humanity and thing-in-itself. During the high school years, Ha's spiritual journey continued. He pursued truth, the meaning of life and humanity in Buddhism, Hinduism and other major religions. In this spiritual journey, he read many western philosophical classics.

Ha was influenced by the works of Sigmund Freud, Carl Gustav Jung, Immanuel Kant and Søren Kierkegaard. Ha experienced spiritual progression recognizing the importance and meaning of human existence, and the 'despair' of Kierkegaard and the 'reason' of Kant became a less serious issue to his life and study. At the end of 12th grade, Ha had a mystical religious experience that made him confess that God is the only answer to his quest for meaning. Ha then became a Christian.

His poetry became an artistic stimulus for artists in parts of England and America.

Career 

Ha became a Presbyterian minister and a professor of historical theology at Korea Presbyterian Theological Seminary. He teaches Biblical Exposition. Ha established Korea Presbyterian Church and the Korea Presbyterian Seminary, serving as Pastoral General, Christian education, Missions etc., at his own expense.

 Ha presented the historical point of view of the Orthodox Church, describing how the confession of faith and the historical context coincide. Ha is a poet, and a reformist theologian. He debuted as a poet by the recommendation of fellow poet Park Jaesam and two others in Hankyoreh Literature Magazine in 1994.

 President, Busan Social Information Forum (BSIF)(NPO, 2003~)
 President, Busan Christian Writers Association (BCWA)(2013~)
 Research Committee Member of the World Association of Korean Writers(2008~ )
 President & Moderator(1st, 2nd), General Assembly of the Orthodox Presbyterian Church of Korea(2014-2017)
 First President, Korea Presbyterian Theological Seminary (2012-2015)
 Council Member of National Unification Advisory Council (2003-2007)
 Expert Member(Unification Education) of Ministry of Unification (2004-2005)
 CG & Chief Executive  of Hyundai PR Research Center (2004-2006)
 CG & Chief Executive of Korea IT Cultural Content Research Institute (2003-2004)
 First Vice Chairman, Korea Universities PR Association (1997)
 Chief Editor, Pusan International Forum (Quarterly Academic journal, 1994-1997)

Literary career 
Ha began to write poems in Han-Kyoreh Literature (한겨레문학). His poem "Recollections of Homo Sapiens" (호모사피엔스의 기억) introduced him to the public. Ha's work faced difficulties, because it conflicted with traditional Korean literature. Nonetheless, Korean writers and poets generally admired his poetic work.

Poetry 

Park Jaesam is a representative of Korea-specific mentality. He evaluated Ha in the examination Review. He found that while Ha's poetry has a deep inner world, life and death, reality and ideal, metaphysics and metaphysics, and self-determination are dominant.

He stated, "Super aesthetic psalm is a manifestation of his poems, and a critical approach is difficult if you do not understand the symbolism of religion and aesthetics to interpret such works."

Professor Kyung-Soo Yoon, among the critics of Ha's poetry, the peculiar one is deepening the symbolic systems of the surreal tendency of Yi Sang (Kim Hae-Kyung) poet, His unique poetical style is considered to be reasonable to see in terms of the mystical experiences and spiritual aspirations that have returned to Christianity.

Since 1994, he announced at the time, such as newspapers, magazines, etc. and has become rather widely known to the general reader rather than a literary background. In particular, while a Christian, religion without being bound to the Christian poetry style, semiotics, and embody the poetic image to deepen the symbolic system of aesthetics. His poems "The sixth tailbone of the Cenozoic era",  "The perspiration from the sun comes out" have appeared well.

In the 2000s after is, the poem "Songs of Wildflowers" depicting the lyricism by intuition and There is a "The story of an elephant's hand expelled by the sky", which can be said to be poetry that first introduced allegorical techniques to the work of poetry.

Other common collaborative poetry books are “There is no way to nostalgia” (Bichnam, 1996), “The Southern Poetry” (Busan Poets' Association, 1999), “Flowers bloom, On the bluestem” (Jaggadeul, 2006), “Seihangobi. (Jaggadeul, 2008), “Forest of Sosa Tree” (Jaggadeul, 2011), “My poetry I choose” (Chaegmandeuneun Jib, 2012).

In recent years, Byeon Uisu literary critic wrote Ha Seungmoo's poetry world, and in his special review commented on poetic excellence:

Notable awards 
 Pride Korea Awarrds 2020(10th)
 Busan branch Citation of the Korea Military Merit Awardees Association(2020) 
 The 34th Busan Metropolitan City Citizen Award(2018)
 2018 National Theologian Award
 Military Manpower Administration Citation(2017)
 Ministry of Foreign Affairs Overseas Koreans Foundation Gold Award(2006)
 National Forum Union & 21 century Bundang Forum Achievement Award(2006)
 Busan University of Foreign Studies Graduate School of Education Achievement Award(1997)
 The 3rd Hankyore New Literary Prize(1994)
 Busan Korea's Christian Literary Society Best Work Award(1995)
 Army Dulumi Church' Merit Appreciation Plaque(in 133rd ADA Battn, 1987)
 Commander Award of the 1st ADA Bde(1986)
 Commander Award of the 1st ADA Bde(1985)
 BnCmd Award of the 1st ADA Bde 133rd ADA Battn.(1986)
 BnCmd Award of the 1st ADA Bde 133rd ADA Battn.(1985) 
 Dongmyeong Technical High School Achievement Award (1984)

Works 
The Southern Poetry (Nambu-eui si: Busan siin sagwajip, 남부의 시: 부산 시인 사화집, 1999). Publisher: Busan Poets' Association (1999) 
Guerrilla, Vol 3. Publisher: Yeni (1999) 
Guerrilla, Vol 4. Publisher: Yeni (1999) 
Australia Korean Literature (Hoju-Hanin Munhak, 호주한인문학). Publisher: The Association of Korean Writers in Australia (2002) 
Australia Korean Literature (Hoju-Hanin Munhak, 호주한인문학). Publisher: The Association of Korean Writers in Australia (2003) 
Flowers on the Blue Stem (Ggodi pinda pureun julgie, 꽃이 핀다 푸른 줄기에,2006).
Seihan Gobi (Seihan gobi, 세이한 고비, 2008).  
Hornbeam Forest (Sosanamu sup, 소사나무 숲, 2011).

Notes
 Who's Who in Korea (Hangugeul umjigineun inmuldeul, 한국을 움직이는 인물들, 2 vols). Publisher: Chungang Ilbosa(1995) 
 Ha Seung Moo, Received "Proud Busan citizen prize" The Busan Ilbo(The Busan Daily News)
 International(Kookje) Poetry Poem ‘Shooting Star’/ Ha Seung Moo  The Kookje Daily News
 Poem and painting of our era  Maeil Jong-gyo Shinmun(Daily religious newspaper).
 Bridgenews  One's family with a story
 The Hankyoreh Newspaper  Poet Ha Seung Moo, Received '2018 Korean Theological Education Award'''
 The Kookje Daily News  List of writers of declaration of the state of affairs Hankook Ilbo  List of writers of declaration of the state of affairs Special Column "Today the political participation of Korean Christians ruins the state" Korea Journal.'' Maeil Jong-gyo Shinmun(Daily religious newspaper).

References

External links 
 한국사 대한민국
 Poet Ha Seung Moo 
 Doosan Encyclopedia(in Korean 하승무) 
 Daum Person Encyclopedia(in Korean 하승무) 
 Naver Person Search(in Korean 하승무) 
 Yonhapnews Person Search(in Korean 하승무)  
 JoongAng Ilbo Person Search(in Korean 하승무) 
 Chosun Ilbo Person Search(in Korean 하승무) 

1963 births
Living people
South Korean Christians
South Korean expatriates in Australia
South Korean theologians
South Korean Calvinist and Reformed Christians
21st-century Calvinist and Reformed theologians
21st-century Calvinist and Reformed Christians
21st-century Presbyterians
Hermeneutists
South Korean democracy activists
20th-century male writers
21st-century male writers
20th-century South Korean poets
21st-century South Korean poets
South Korean male poets
People from Sacheon